[[File:Youngmarrieds.JPG|thumb|Screenshot of The Young Marrieds]]The Young Marrieds (1972) is a pornographic film written and directed by Ed Wood. Reportedly, this was made after Necromania, and is thought to be Wood's last film (as director) before his death.

Plot

Preservation
Previously thought lost, a 16 mm print was discovered by porn archeologist Dimitrios Otis in Vancouver, British Columbia, in 2004. The film was released on DVD by Alpha Blue Archives on August 1, 2014 and by After Hours Cinema on November 18, 2014.

See also
Ed Wood filmography
List of rediscovered films

References
 The Haunted World of Edward D. Wood, Jr. (1996), documentary film directed by Brett Thompson
 Rudolph Grey, Nightmare of Ecstasy: The Life and Art of Edward D. Wood, Jr.'' (1992)

External links

1970s pornographic films
1972 films
Films directed by Ed Wood
Films with screenplays by Ed Wood
1970s rediscovered films
Rediscovered American films
American pornographic films
1970s American films